Butterkist is a brand of popcorn owned by KP Snacks. It is the United Kingdom's best-selling brand of popcorn, with around 40% of the £90 million market.

History
In 1914, Fred Hoke and James Holcomb began to sell popcorn machines in Kentucky, United States under the brand of Butter-Kist. As their business developed, vendors began buying popcorn machines and the brand began to spread. In 1938 Butter-Kist machines made their way to the UK via an unknown route, developing the brand as in the United States through sales to cinema audiences. During World War II, the brand developed quickly, thanks to the many United States Army personnel stationed in the UK ready for the invasion of Europe.

After the Second World War, Craven Keiller developed a factory in York to sell Butterkist branded popcorn direct to cinema chains. As many items were rationed in the UK post the Second World War, but the basic ingredients of Butterkist were not, the brand developed into the UK's lead selling popcorn brand. The sales of the brand then followed the development and decline in cinema audiences, so that after the boom of the 1950s and 1980s, by 1998 sales were on another downturn and Craven Keiller sold the brand to Cadbury Trebor Bassett, which in 2000 merged the brand into its Monkhill Confectionery subsidiary and moved production to Pontefract, West Yorkshire. 

As part of its development strategy selling off non-core brands, from April 2006 Cadbury Schweppes put Monkhill into a group of non-core brands it would review putting up for sale, and from June 2007 appointed investment bankers Investec to review the sale of Monkhill Confectionery, and its best selling brand Butterkist.

Butterkist, along with other Monkhill brands, was sold to Tangerine Confectionery in February 2008.  The Butterkist brand was sold once again on 17 July 2017 to KP Snacks.

Marketing
After being dropped by various cinema brands in the 1990s, the brand was realigned to the growing home cinema market, with a 350g family sized tub launched with a link to family cinema review site popcorn.co.uk in 2000 in a program run by advertising agency Market Tiers 4DC, before the brand was completely relaunched in 2005, using a heart logo to (quote) "symbolise Britain's love of the Butterkist brand."

Having for many years used the chant logo "Butterkist, Butterkist, Ra ra ra!" the brand is currently marketed under a comedic slant of "Butterkist: the fun's never done..." and tying up with cartoon family The Simpsons from mid-2006.

Presently, approximately 5,000 tonnes of Butterkist are produced each year. The red Butterkist bag is sold exclusively in the UK, and is available to buy in cinemas as well as supermarkets and independent retailers. The Butterkist range includes 25g,  50g, 100g, and 200g (the most popular item in the range), individual bags, a 350g plastic tub, and a 6 x 30g multipack for the toffee variant, and 120g bags and 250g tubs for the Cinema sweet and 80g Salted bag. Butterkist Toffee popcorn is suitable for vegetarians (but not vegans), while Butterkist Cinema sweet popcorn and Salted popcorn is suitable for both vegetarians and vegans. Butterkist is also available as take home, microwave packs in Salted, sweet and butter variants. 

According to The Grocer Magazine, there were plans for a chocolate popcorn to be launched sometime in September 2010.

See also

 List of popcorn brands

References

External links
Butterkist
More About Butterkist

British confectionery
Popcorn brands
Cadbury-Schweppes brands
Foods featuring butter